Sin Límite is the second studio album of the musical duo Magnate & Valentino. It was released in 2004 following their debut album Rompiendo el Hielo in 2002.

Track list
"Intro" (0:54)
"Ahí Voy Yo" (3:07)
"Tu Amante" (3:48)
"Dile A Ella" (4:36)
"Bésame" (3:14)
"Ya Lo Sé" (3:46)
"Entre Tú Y Yo" (2:08)
"Fiera Callada" (3:43)
"La Soledad" (3:40)
"Punto Y Coma" (3:36)
"Métele Dembow" (3:33)
"Amanécete Conmigo" (3:15)
"Te Encontré - Magnate" (4:15)
"Vuelve A Mí" (3:38)
"Si Tú No Estás" (4:10)
"Amanécete Conmigo (Versión Dance Hall)"(3:32)

Magnate & Valentino albums
2005 albums